The term Foothills Trail may refer to: 

 Foothills Trail, a 76-mile trail in South and North Carolina for recreational hiking and backpacking.
 Pierce County Foothills Trail, a rail-trail in Pierce County, Washington.